Baker Island, formerly known as New Nantucket, is an uninhabited atoll just north of the Equator in the central Pacific Ocean about  southwest of Honolulu. The island lies almost halfway between Hawaii and Australia. Its nearest neighbor is Howland Island,  to the north-northwest; both have been claimed as territories of the United States since 1857, though the United Kingdom considered them part of the British Empire between 1897 and 1936.

The climate is equatorial, with little rainfall, constant wind, and strong sunshine.

The island now forms the Baker Island National Wildlife Refuge and is an unincorporated and unorganized territory of the U.S. which vouches for its defense. It is visited annually by the U.S. Fish and Wildlife Service. For statistical purposes, Baker is grouped with the United States Minor Outlying Islands. Baker Island and Howland Island are also the last pieces of land that experience the New Year (furthest behind time zone - UTC−12:00).
Baker Island is one of the most remote U.S. equatorial possessions.

Description
A cemetery and rubble from earlier settlements are located near the middle of the west coast, where the boat landing area is located. There are no ports or harbors, with anchorage prohibited offshore. The narrow fringing reef surrounding the island can be a maritime hazard, so there is a day beacon near the old village site.

During a 1935–1942 colonization attempt, the island was most likely on Hawaii time, which was then 10.5 hours behind UTC. Since it is uninhabited the island's time zone is unspecified, but it lies within a nautical time zone 12 hours behind UTC (UTC−12:00).

History

Baker was discovered in 1818 by Captain Elisha Folger of the Nantucket whaling ship Equator, who called the island "New Nantucket". In August 1825 Baker was sighted by Captain Obed Starbuck of the Loper, also a Nantucket whaler. The island is named for Michael Baker, who visited the island in 1834. Other references state that he visited in 1832, and again on August 14, 1839, in the whaler Gideon Howland, to bury an American seaman. Captain Baker claimed the island in 1855, then he sold his interest to a group who later formed the American Guano Company.

The United States took possession of the island in 1857, claiming it under the Guano Islands Act of 1856. Its guano deposits were mined by the American Guano Company from 1859 to 1878. Laborers for the mining operations came from around the Pacific, including from Hawaii; the Hawaiian laborers named Baker Island "" ('the ‘ilima flower'). As an example of the scale of the guano mining and its destination the following ship movements were reported in late 1868.
 British ship Montebello, Capt Henderson, arrived Aug 17th 104 days from Liverpool, loaded 650 tons guano, departed for Liverpool 9th Sep.
 American ship Eldorado, Capt Woodside, arrived Sept 14th from Honolulu, loaded 1550 tons guano, departed for Liverpool Oct 5th.
 British bark Florence Chipman, Capt Smith, arrived Oct 13th from Rio, loaded 1400 tons guano, departed for Liverpool Nov 5th.

On February 27, 1869, the British ship Shaftsbury under Captain John Davies, which had arrived at Baker's Island on 5 February from Montevideo, was wrecked after being driven onto the reef by a sudden wind shift and squall from the northwest, dragging her moorings with her. American ship Robin Hood was destroyed by fire while loading on 30 August 1869.

On 7 December 1886, the American Guano Company sold all its rights to the British firm John T. Arundel and Company, which made the island its headquarters for guano digging operations in the Pacific from 1886 to 1891. Arundel applied in 1897 to the British Colonial Office for a licence to work the island on the presumption that the U.S. had abandoned their claim. The United Kingdom then considered Baker Island to be a British territory, although they never formally annexed it. The United States raised the question at the beginning of the 1920s and after some diplomatic exchanges, in 1935 they launched the American Equatorial Islands Colonization Project and in May 1936 issued Executive Order 7358 to clarify their sovereignty.

This short-lived attempt at colonization, via the American Equatorial Islands Colonization Project, began when American colonists arrived aboard the USCGC Itasca, the same vessel that brought colonists to neighboring Howland Island, on April 3, 1935. They built a lighthouse and substantial dwellings, and they attempted to grow various plants. The settlement was named Meyerton, after Captain H.A. Meyer of the United States Army, who helped establish the camps in 1935. One sad-looking clump of coconut palms was jokingly called King–Doyle Park after two well-known citizens of Hawaii who visited on the Taney in 1938. This clump was the best on the island, planted near a water seep, but the dry climate and seabirds, eager for anything upon which to perch, did not give the trees or shrubs much of a chance to survive. King–Doyle Park was later adopted as a geographic name by the United States Geological Survey. According to the 1940 U.S. Census, its population was three American civilians, all of whom were evacuated in 1942 after Japanese air and naval attacks. During World War II it was occupied by the U.S. military.

Airfield

On August 11, 1943, a US Army defense force arrived on Baker Island as part of the Gilbert and Marshall Islands campaign. In September 1943 a  airfield was opened and was subsequently used as a staging base by Seventh Air Force B-24 Liberator bombers for attacks on Mili Atoll. The 45th Fighter Squadron operated P-40 fighters from the airfield from September 1 - November 27, 1943. By January 1, 1944, the airfield was abandoned.

LORAN Station Baker
LORAN radio navigation station Baker was a radio operations base in operation from September 1944 to July 1946. The station unit number was 91 and the radio call sign was NRN-1.

Flora and fauna
Baker has no natural fresh water sources. It is treeless, with sparse vegetation consisting of four kinds of grass, prostrate vines and low-growing shrubs. The island, with its surrounding waters, is primarily a nesting, roosting, and foraging habitat for seabirds, waders and marine wildlife. It has been recognised as an Important Bird Area (IBA) by BirdLife International because it supports breeding colonies of lesser frigatebirds, masked boobies and sooty terns. Several species of migratory, arctic-breeding waders visit the island seasonally, including ruddy turnstones, bar-tailed godwits, sanderlings, Pacific golden plovers and bristle-thighed curlews. Green turtles and hawksbill turtles, both critically endangered, can be found along the reef.

National Wildlife Refuge
On June 27, 1974, Secretary of the Interior Rogers Morton created Baker Island National Wildlife Refuge which was expanded in 2009 to add submerged lands within  of the island. Baker, along with six other islands, was administered by the U.S. Fish and Wildlife Service as part of the Pacific Remote Islands National Wildlife Refuge Complex. In January 2009, that entity was redesignated the Pacific Remote Islands Marine National Monument by President George W. Bush.

Environmental challenges include abandoned military debris from World War II and illegal fishing offshore. Invasive exotics introduced by human activity, including cockroaches and coconut palms, have also displaced native wildlife. Feral cats, first introduced in 1937, were eradicated in 1965.

Public entry to the island is only by special use permit from the U.S. Fish and Wildlife Service and it is generally restricted to scientists and educators. Representatives from the agency visit the island on average once every two years, usually coordinating transportation with a NOAA vessel.

Ruins and artifacts
Debris from past human occupation is scattered throughout the island and in offshore waters. Most is from the U.S. military occupation of the island from 1942 to 1946. The most noticeable remnant is the  airstrip. It is completely overgrown with vegetation and is unusable. In the northeast section, apparently the main camp area, are the remains of several buildings and heavy equipment. Debris from several crashed airplanes and large equipment such as bulldozers are scattered around the island. Numerous bulldozer excavations containing the remnants of metal, fuel and water drums are scattered about the north central portion and northern edge of the island. The Navy reported the loss of 11 landing craft in the surf during World War II.

Gallery

See also

 64th Coast Artillery (United States)
 History of the Pacific Islands
 Howland and Baker Islands, includes coverage of the Howland-Baker EEZ
 List of Guano Island claims
 List of islands of the United States
 List of lighthouses in the United States Minor Outlying Islands

References

External links

 Baker Island National Wildlife Refuge
 Baker Island. This article incorporates material from The World Factbook 2000.

 
Coral islands
Uninhabited Pacific islands of the United States
Important Bird Areas of United States Minor Outlying Islands
Important Bird Areas of Oceania
Seabird colonies